Rukirabasaija Kaboyo Omuhundwa Kasusunkwanzi Olimi I was Omukama of the Kingdom of Tooro, from around 1830 until around 1861. He was the first (1st) Omukama of Tooro.

Claim to the throne
He was the eldest son of Rukirabasaija Agutamba Nyamutukura Kyebambe III, Omukama of Bunyoro-Kitara at that time. His mother was a lady of the Ababwiju clan. He rebelled against his father and established his own kingdom at Kaboyo during his father's lifetime, beginning in 1822. He spurned the succession to Bunyoro-Kitara on his father's death.

Married life
Not much is known about the married life of Omukama Olimi I

Offspring
The offspring of Omukama Olimi I of Toro included the following:

 Prince (Omubiito) whose name is not known. This prince  fathered a son, one Prince (Omubiito) Kabuzi, a nephew of Nyaika, assisted his uncle Mushaga I in his campaign to seize the throne. He was defeated and killed at Kanyanyange, together with a number of other princes in 1870. Prince Kabuzi fathered a son; Prince (Omubiito) Isansa.
 Prince (Omubiito) Barongo.
 Rukirabasaija Kazana Ruhaga, Omukama of Toro, from 1862 until 1866.
 Rukirabasaija Kasunga Kyebambe Nyaika, Omukama of Toro, from  1866 until 1870 and from 1871 until 1872.
 Rukirabasaija Kato Rukidi I, Omukama of Toro, from 1871 until 1871
 Prince (Omubiito), whose name is also unknown. This unnamed prince II, fathered a son, Rukirabasaija Kakende Nyanuyonjo, Omukama of Toro, who reigned from 1876 until 1876.
 Prince (Omubiito) Kato.
 Prince (Omubiito) Ndahura Mushaga. He rebelled against his brother Omukama Nyaika, but was defeated and killed, together with his nephew, Bulemu, in 1869.
 Princess (Omubiitokati) Komuntale, Chiefess of Bulera.
 Princess (Omubiitokati) Kibundabunda, Chiefess of Butanda.
 Princess (Omubiitokati) Bayanjeru.

The final days
Omukama Olimi I died around 1865

Succession table

See also
 Omukama of Toro

References

Toro
Toro people
19th-century rulers in Africa